Combinations  is the second full-length album by the band Eisley.  It was released on August 14, 2007.

The first single for Combinations was "Invasion".  Two music videos were intended to be shot for the single.  One was a "viral video" for YouTube and iTunes and another was rumored to be made for MTV and other media outlet, but due to assumed conflict with their label and confusion on how to market the band, only one video was made. Invasion wasn't pushed to radio and was the only "single" for the album. A video for Many Funerals that was shot by Israel Anthem was spoken about around the time of the band's acoustic tour in 2007, but never surfaced.

A special edition CD/DVD includes eight songs from the band’s Ventura, CA, concert, the Memories video and a 30-minute The Making Of Combinations video piece. The cover art is coloured blue instead of yellow. A vinyl release was expected as the band was recording, but one never came to be. The band is now working on getting it released on vinyl in a combo pack with Room Noises (which only got pressed for 1000 vinyl copies originally).

Combinations debuted in the Billboard 100 with first week sales of 9,300.

Track listing

Special Edition DVD
 The "Making Of" Combinations
 Ventura, CA concert footage
 "Mr. Pine"
 "Memories"
 "Just Like We Do"
 "Marvelous Things"
 "Head Against the Sky"
 "Golly Sandra"
 "Like The Actors"
 "Trolley Wood"
 Memories music video

Eisley albums
2007 albums